Shovnali Union is a union parishad in Assasuni Upazila of Satkhira District, in Khulna Division, Bangladesh.

References

Unions of Assasuni Upazila
Populated places in Satkhira District